Ballerina with Action Man Parts is a sculpture by graffiti artist Banksy. In 2007, it sold for £96,000.

References

2007 sculptures
Dance in art
Works by Banksy